Juan Raul Echevarrieta (23 July 1911 – 27 November 1987 in Florianópolis) was an Argentine football player at the position of striker.

Career
He played for Gimnasia y Esgrima, Palmeiras, Santos and Ypiranga.  Echevarrieta scored 127 goals for Palmeiras and is one of the club's all-time leading scorers.

Honours
Palmeiras
São Paulo State Championship: 1940, 1942

References

External links
 Juan Raul Echevarrieta at BDFA.com.ar 

1911 births
1987 deaths
Argentine footballers
Club de Gimnasia y Esgrima La Plata footballers
Sociedade Esportiva Palmeiras players
Santos FC players
Expatriate footballers in Brazil
Association football forwards